Hans-Jürgen Krumnow (17 February 1943 – 11 July 2015) was a German footballer. He played the entirety of his career in West Berlin for Hertha BSC and Blau-Weiß 90 Berlin.

References

External links 
Profile at kicker.de

1943 births
2015 deaths
German footballers
Association football goalkeepers
Hertha BSC players
Bundesliga players